KylieFever2002 was the seventh concert tour by Australian pop singer Kylie Minogue, in support of her eighth studio album, Fever (2001). The tour began on 26 April 2002 in Cardiff, Wales at Cardiff International Arena and concluded on 16 August 2002 in Melbourne, Australia at the Rod Laver Arena, consisting of 38 shows in Europe and 11 shows in Australia.

The show in Manchester on 4 May 2002 was filmed and broadcast on MSN, and was released on a DVD titled KylieFever2002: Live in Manchester, along with a bonus CD.

Background
The tour was the biggest production Minogue had put on at that time. The album and its music videos were able to provide and inspire multiple stage sets and costume changes, the first of its kind to use projection. The tour had a much larger budget than past shows due to the success of the album and its singles. Due to the increase in money the stage sets were able to become much grander with two staircases and five projection screens which were used to enhance the different themes of the show.

The costumes for the show were designed exclusively for Minogue by Italian designers Dolce & Gabbana. The choreographer for the tour was Rafael Bonachela.

It was Minogue's first tour to have sponsors, which were Evian and Vodafone. At each of the UK shows, sponsors Evian gave away free bottles of water, the packaging for which replaced the Evian branding with the name 'Kylie'. Bottles were also marked with the words, "Evian – Kylie's official thirst quencher for the 2002 Fever Tour".

As the album's lead single began to grow in the U.S., Minogue devoted time before the tour to promote the song and album. Minogue's visit sparked rumors of a tour in the States. Rumors spread of bandmembers and dancers applying for U.S. work visas. According to Capitol Records president Andy Slater, a U.S. tour has not been discussed. Minogue commented on her reluctance to tour the States. She felt the American audience wouldn't "get" her live shows and wouldn't know her back catalogue. Despite rumors of a North American leg, plans never developed due to Minogue's status in that country. During the time, British magazine Hello reported a U.S. tour had been cancelled, so that Minogue could focus on her personal life. It was later revealed Minogue was swayed differently by her management. However, Minogue did tour the U.S. with Jingle Ball, an annual concert produced on by KIIS-FM, visiting Anaheim, Houston, Miami, Philadelphia and New York City. For the Jingle Ball shows, Minogue performed five songs from the set list of the tour: "Come into My World", "Love at First Sight", "The Loco-Motion", "In Your Eyes" Latin section and "Can't Get You Out of My Head".

A special webcast of the show at the Manchester Arena was shown exclusively on MSN UK live for fans around the world.

Concert synopsis
Across the tour, each show was split into seven acts and an encore, with 18 songs performed (as well as an introduction and four interludes).

Silvanemesis opened the show with an introduction of "The Sound of Music". Kylie then rises out of the stage encased in a metallic outfit dubbed the "Kyborg". This peels back to reveal Kylie in a silver bra and mini-skirt with matching boots. She goes on to sing "Come into My World" and a remixed version of "Shocked". She then welcomes the audience and sings "Love at First Sight". She then introduces the title track "Fever", which closes the act.

Droogie Nights begins with an interlude of Beethoven's "Ode to Joy". This then leads into a new remix of "Spinning Around", where Kylie and the dancers are dressed to resemble characters from A Clockwork Orange.

The Crying Game begins with an interlude of "Where Is the Feeling?" before the left screen rises to reveal Minogue in a black ball gown singing Boy George's "The Crying Game". She then goes onto perform a medley of three of her own songs: "Put Yourself in My Place", "Finer Feelings" and "Dangerous Game" before returning to "The Crying Game" and closing the act.

Streetstyle begins with an interlude of "GBI: German Bold Italic". A dancer appears and imitates drawing graffiti on a screen, with Minogue then entering dressed as a police woman to sing "Confide in Me". She then goes on to sing "Cowboy Style" and finishes the act by inviting the backing vocalists to sing "Kids" with her.

Sex in Venice opens with "On a Night Like This", where she and the dancers are dressed in corsets. After this, she sings a new version of "The Locomotion" and then performs "In Your Eyes", which transitions into a Latin-style medley after the chorus, containing "Please Stay" and "Rhythm of the Night". She then finishes off the act with a reprise of "In Your Eyes".

Cybertronica is the sixth section and begins with a tap dance interlude, followed by a remixed version of "Limbo", which saw Minogue rise out of the stage. Following this, she sang a new remix of "Light Years" which featured a chorus of "I Feel Love". To close the act, she sang a new version of "I Should Be So Lucky" that contained elements of her song "Dreams".

Voodoo Inferno is the final section before the encore, beginning with a percussion interlude, before revealing Minogue rising above the stage wearing an oversized red dress singing "Burning Up", revealing 12 dancers beneath it later in the song. She then closes the main body of the show with "Better the Devil You Know".

For the one-song encore, Minogue appeared from under the catwalk in a white waistcoat and cargo pants to sing the Blue Monday mix of "Can't Get You Out of My Head".

Setlist
Act 1: Silvanemesis
"The Sound of Music" (Introduction)
"Come into My World"
"Shocked" (contains elements of "Madskillz-Mic Chekka")
"Love at First Sight"
"Fever"

Act 2: Droogie Nights
"Symphony No. 9, Op. 125 (Ode to Joy)" (Interlude)
"Spinning Around" (contains elements of "September")

Act 3: The Crying Game
"Where Is the Feeling?" (Interlude)
"The Crying Game" / "Put Yourself in My Place" (contains elements of "Teardrop") / "Finer Feelings" / "Dangerous Game" / "The Crying Game" (Reprise)

Act 4: Street Style
"GBI: German Bold Italic" (Interlude)
"Confide in Me"
"Cowboy Style" (contains elements of "Double Dutch Bus", "Double Dutch" and "Buffalo Gals", with excerpts from "The Real Slim Shady")
"Kids"

Act 5: Sex in Venice
"On a Night Like This"
"The Locomotion"
"In Your Eyes" / "Please Stay" / "Rhythm of the Night" / "In Your Eyes" (Reprise)

Act 6: Cybertronica
"Cybertronica" (Interlude)
"Limbo"
"Light Years" / "I Feel Love"
"I Should Be So Lucky" (contains excerpts from "Dreams")

Act 7: Voodoo Inferno
"Burning Up"
"Better the Devil You Know"
Encore
"Can't Get You Out of My Head" (contains elements of "Blue Monday")

Tour dates

Cancelled shows

Personnel

Kylie Minogue – executive producer
Bill Lord – executive producer
Terry Blamey  – executive producer, management
Andrew Small – musical director, drums
William Baker – creative director
 Alan McDonald – creative director
Steve Anderson – musical producer
Sean Fitzpatrick – tour manager
Steve Martin – tour production manager
Vince Foster – lighting designer
Chris Keating – concert video director
Rafael Bonachela – choreographer
Amy Hollingsworth – assistant choreographer
Dolce & Gabbana – costumes
Steve Turner – keyboards
Chris Brown – bass
James Hayto – guitar
Lurine Cato – backing vocals
Sherina White – backing vocals
DJ Ziggy – turntables and scratching
Terry Kvasnik – acrobat
 Pia Driver – dancer
Patti Hines – dancer
Milena Mancini – dancer
Alec Mann – dancer
Jason Piper – dancer
Adam Pudney – dancer
Emma Ribbing – dancer
Alicia Herrero Simon – dancer
Andile E Sotiya – dancer
Melanie Teall – dancer
Rod Buchanan – dancer

External links
Minogue's Official site

References

"2002 KylieFever"
Kylie Minogue notable Tours-Part 4 – Fever Tour 2002
FEVER TOUR 2002

Kylie Minogue concert tours
2002 concert tours